Isotealia is a genus of sea anemones in the family Actiniidae.

Species
The World Register of Marine Species includes the following species in the genus:-
Isotealia antarctica Carlgren, 1899
Isotealia dubia (Wassilieff, 1908)

References

Actiniidae
Hexacorallia genera